"Breathe (In the Air)" is a song by English progressive rock band Pink Floyd. It appears on their 1973 album The Dark Side of the Moon.

Authorship and composition

The authorship and composition of this song is credited to David Gilmour and Richard Wright for the music and Roger Waters for the lyrics. Dark Side, admitted the latter, "is a little adolescent and naïve in its preoccupations, but I'm not belittling it. It's like a rather wonderful, naïve painting. 'Breathe in the air / Don't be afraid to care' – that's the opening couplet. Well, yeah, I can cop that, but it's kind of simplistic stuff."

The song is slow-paced and rich in texture, and features Gilmour playing the electric guitar with a Uni-Vibe and lap steel guitar with a volume pedal and several overdubs. On the original album, it is a separate track from "Speak to Me", the sound collage that opens the first side. Since this track segues into "Breathe" via a sustained backwards piano chord, the two are conjoined on most CD versions of the album. A one-minute reprise features at the end of the song "Time", without the slide guitar and using Farfisa organ and Wurlitzer electronic piano in place of Hammond organ and Rhodes piano.

The chords for much of the song alternate between E minor(add9) and A major, with a turnaround appearing before the verses and then functioning as a chorus, consisting of C major seventh, B minor seventh, F major seventh, G major, D7(9) and D#dim. Wright admitted to having lifted the D7(#9) in the progression from Miles Davis' Kind of Blue. It is an exact quote from bar 9 of "All Blues" even though the 2 songs are in different keys. 

Along with the other Pink Floyd tracks "Time" and "The Great Gig in the Sky", "Breathe" is seen as Gilmour "carving out a more distinctive style" with the introduction of blues-based chords and solos. "Breathe" has also been seen to "embrace ecology".

This song was one of several to be considered for the band's "best of" album, Echoes: The Best of Pink Floyd.

Alternative and live versions
The Pulse CD and DVD features a live version of the song with a run time of 2:33.
The song was played at the Live 8 concert and features on the DVD. For that performance, "Breathe" and "Breathe (Reprise)" were combined to form one song. Although Pink Floyd themselves had never done this before, the London Philharmonic Orchestra had previously covered the song in this manner on their 1995 album Us and Them: Symphonic Pink Floyd.
The solo Roger Waters DVD and CD, In the Flesh – Live, features a version of the song sung by Doyle Bramhall and Jon Carin.
Live versions with Richard Wright appear on the Gilmour solo Remember That Night DVD and Live in Gdańsk CD. The Live in Gdańsk version is titled "Breathe (In the Air)" rather than just "Breathe".
 "Breathe (Reprise)" appears (along with "Time") on Gilmour's 2017 live video and album Live at Pompeii.
 A live version is found on The Dark Side of the Moon Live at Wembley 1974 (2023).

Personnel
 David Gilmour – electric guitar, multi-tracked pedal steel guitars, lead and backing vocals
 Roger Waters – bass guitar
 Richard Wright – Hammond organ, Fender Rhodes electric piano
 Nick Mason – drums

Certifications

Cover versions
 An orchestrated version, arranged by Jaz Coleman, appears on the 1995 London Philharmonic Orchestra album Us and Them: Symphonic Pink Floyd.
 Sea of Green covered "Breathe" and "Breathe (Reprise)" on their album Time to Fly in 2001.
 "Breathe" is covered on 2002 Pink Floyd tribute album An All Star Lineup Performing the Songs of Pink Floyd featuring McAuley Schenker Group vocalist Robin McAuley and Steely Dan/Doobie Brothers guitarist Jeff "Skunk" Baxter.
 Flaming Lips included a version of "Breathe" in their act at the Glastonbury Festival in 2003 and frequently during their subsequent tour and performed a live version for Late Night with Jimmy Fallon in 2010. Flaming Lips also covered the song with Stardeath and White Dwarfs on the band's 2009 album The Flaming Lips and Stardeath and White Dwarfs with Henry Rollins and Peaches Doing The Dark Side of the Moon.
 A version of "Breathe" by The Shins is included on the 2007 compilation album The Saturday Sessions: The Dermot O'Leary Show.
 Capital Cities covered the song and incorporated a sample of Tupac Shakur's rap from Scarface's "Smile," which features a similar lyric to the Pink Floyd song.
 Ocean Alley covered the song in a medley as well as Comfortably Numb and Money for Triple J's Like A Version in 2021.

References

1973 songs
Pink Floyd songs
Rock ballads
Songs of the Vietnam War
Songs written by David Gilmour
Songs written by Richard Wright (musician)
Songs written by Roger Waters
Song recordings produced by David Gilmour
Song recordings produced by Roger Waters
Song recordings produced by Richard Wright (musician)
Song recordings produced by Nick Mason